Riverton is an unincorporated community on the North Fork South Branch Potomac River in Pendleton County, West Virginia, United States. Riverton lies along U.S. Highway 33/West Virginia Route 28 in the Monongahela National Forest.

Climate
This climatic region is typified by large seasonal temperature differences, with warm to hot (and often humid) summers and cold (sometimes severely cold) winters.  According to the Köppen Climate Classification system, Riverton has a humid continental climate, abbreviated "Dfb" on climate maps.

References

Unincorporated communities in Pendleton County, West Virginia
Unincorporated communities in West Virginia